Californian is an adjective describing something related to the American state of California. It is also the demonym for a person from California. 

It may also refer to:

Ships
Californian (schooner), the "Official Tall Ship Ambassador for the State of California"
Californian (ship)
 SS Californian, British passenger ship famous for her relationship to the RMS Titanic disaster of 1912
 , early American motor vessel

Other uses
 Californian, a font designed by Frederic Goudy for the University of California Press
 The Californian, a coupe version of the British Hillman Imp automobile
 The Salinas Californian, the daily newspaper of Salinas, California
 The Bakersfield Californian, the daily newspaper of Bakersfield, California

See also
 California (disambiguation)
 Californian English, a dialect spoken in California
 List of Latin and Greek words commonly used in systematic names#C, a word in Latin found in species names
 List of people from California
 The Californian (disambiguation), including several periodicals